Pia Viitanen (born 7 April 1967 in Tampere) is a Finnish politician and a member of the Social Democratic Party. She was the Minister of Culture and Housing in Alexander Stubb's cabinet.

References

1967 births
Living people
Politicians from Tampere
Social Democratic Party of Finland politicians
Government ministers of Finland
Members of the Parliament of Finland (1995–99)
Members of the Parliament of Finland (1999–2003)
Members of the Parliament of Finland (2003–07)
Members of the Parliament of Finland (2007–11)
Members of the Parliament of Finland (2011–15)
Members of the Parliament of Finland (2015–19)
Members of the Parliament of Finland (2019–23)
Women government ministers of Finland
21st-century Finnish women politicians
Women members of the Parliament of Finland
20th-century Finnish women politicians